Events in the year 1988 in the Republic of India.

Incumbents
 President of India – R. Venkataraman
 Prime Minister of India – Rajiv Gandhi
 Chief Justice of India – Raghunandan Swarup Pathak

Governors
 Andhra Pradesh – Kumud Ben Joshi 
 Arunachal Pradesh – R. D. Pradhan
 Assam – Bhishma Narain Singh
 Bihar – P. Venkatasubbaiah (until 25 February), Govind Narain Singh (starting 25 February)
 Goa – Gopal Singh 
 Gujarat – Ram Krishna Trivedi 
 Haryana – Saiyid Muzaffar Husain Burney (until 21 February), Hari Anand Barari (starting 22 February)
 Himachal Pradesh – R. K. S. Ghandhi
 Jammu and Kashmir – Jagmohan Malhotra 
 Karnataka – Pendekanti Venkatasubbaiah 
 Kerala – P. Ramachandran (until 23 February), Ram Dulari Sinha (starting 23 February)
 Madhya Pradesh – K.M Chandy
 Maharashtra – vacant thereafter (until 23 February), Ram Dulari Sinha (starting 23 February)
 Manipur – K. V. Krishna Rao 
 Meghalaya – Bhishma Narain Singh
 Mizoram – Hiteswar Saikia
 Nagaland – K. V. Krishna Rao 
 Odisha – Bishambhar Nath Pande (until 20 November), Saiyid Nurul Hasan (starting 20 November)
 Punjab – Siddhartha Shankar Ray 
 Rajasthan – Sukhdev Prasad (starting 20 February)
 Sikkim – T.V. Rajeswar
 Tamil Nadu – Sundar Lal Khurana (until 16 February), P. C. Alexander (starting 16 February)
 Tripura – K. V. Krishna Rao 
 Uttar Pradesh – Mohammed Usman Arif 
 West Bengal – Saiyid Nurul Hasan

Events
 National income - 4,293,630 million
 Shadow of the Almighty Faith Tabernacle Ministries is founded.
 The National Consumer Disputes Redressal Commission is set up under the Consumer Protection Act of 1986.
 Viswanathan Anand became first Grandmaster from India , in chess
 Voting age reduced from 21 to 18 years
 August - Floods in Punjab, Haryana
 6 August – The 1988 Myanmar–India earthquake measuring magnitude 7.3 strikes the Sagaing–Assam border, killing 5 people and leaving over 30 injured or missing.
 21 August – The 6.9  Bihar earthquake shook northern Bihar near Nepal with a maximum Mercalli intensity of VIII (Severe), killing 709–1,450.
 October – Maximum lending rate abolished. Banks free to charge customers according to their credit record.
 26 December - caste violence between Kapus and Kammas erupts in costal districts of Andhra Pradesh following death of a Congress I M.L.A named Vangaveeti Mohana Ranga Rao.

Law
 April – Security & Exchange Board of India established to deal with the development and regulation of the securities market and investor protection.
 The Discount and Finance House of India, set up as a money market institution, commenced operations.
 July – The National Housing Bank established as an apex body of housing finance and to promote activities in housing development.
 August – Stock Holding Corporation of India, a depository institution, commenced operations.

Births
4 January – Nabila Jamshed, novelist.
25 January – Cheteshwar Pujara, cricketer.
20 February – Jiah Khan, actress.(d.2013)
5 March – Khonthoujam Boboi Singh, Indian footballer
8 April –
Saqib Saleem, model and actor.
Nithya Menen, actress.
1 May  Anushka Sharma, actress and film producer.
16 May – Vicky Kaushal, actor
6 June - Ajinkya Rahane, cricketer.
10 July - Manjari Fadnis, film actress
 26 July  Akanksha Puri, actress and model.
2 September - Ishant Sharma, cricketer.
6 September – Sargun Mehta, TV actress
12 September – Prachi Desai, actress.
22 September – Sana Saeed, actress and model.
26 September – Sandhya, film actress
5 November – Virat Kohli, cricketer
25 November – Rochelle Rao, model and anchor.
28 November  Yami Gautam, actress.
2 December – Soniya Mehra, actress.
6 December - Ravindra Jadeja, cricketer.
24 December – Piyush Chawla, cricketer.

Deaths
 August – Mahendra Lal Wadhwa, freedom fighter (born 1900)
 29 October – Kamaladevi Chattopadhyay, social reformer and freedom fighter (born 1903)
 24 December – Jainendra Kumar, novelist (born 1905)
 2 June – Raj Kapoor, actor in Bollywood (born 1924)

Full date unknown
 Majnun Gorakhpuri, writer and literary critic (born 1904)

See also 
 Bollywood films of 1988

References

 
India
Years of the 20th century in India